Karosa B 731 is an urban bus produced by bus manufacturer Karosa from the Czech Republic, in the years of 1982 to 1996. It was succeeded by Karosa B 931 in 1996.

Construction features 
Karosa B 731 is a model of the Karosa 700 series. The B 731 is derived from the Karosa C 734 intercity bus, and also unified with city bus models such as the B 741 and the B 732. The body is semi-self-supporting with frame and engine with automatic gearbox in the rear part. The engine drives only the rear axle. The front axle is independent, while the rear axle is solid. All axles are mounted on air suspension. On the right side are three doors (first are narrower than middle doors). Inside are used leatherette seats, plastic Vogelsitze or Fainsa seats. The driver's cab is separated from the rest of the vehicle by a glazed partition (first series produced until 1984 didn't have partition). In the middle, or in the rear part is room for a pram or wheelchair.

Type B 731 (as well as whole 700 series) underwent during its long production many changes and modifications. Among the most significant belonged replacing of the noisy rear axles Rába with another that has not produced so much noise, change of the engine mounting and change the location of alternator, use of several types of engines LIAZ, initially aspirated, turbocharged later. In newer buses have also been used automatic gearbox Voith (apparently from 1991) instead of the product of Praga. Began to be mounted exhaust gas catalysators EKOS and between 1993 and 1994, the buses were equipped with intercooler and intake air (due to meet emission standards Euro1), which also led to modifications of the body – behind the third door was placed the intake grille. In the last buses from the year 1995 appeared motor Renault. These buses were numbered B 731.1659 and were produced in only 50 pieces. Due to the assortment offered gearbox with retarder to the engines LIAZ cars were B 731 since 1994 produced with extended rear (the very first bus with a very similar rear was already made in 1992, it was a prototype B17). These were types B 731.1667 and B 731.1669 with LIAZ engines and Voith gearbox with integrated retarder. The rear panel is identical to then produced 900 series.

Production and operation 
In 1981 started serial production, which continued until 1996.

Currently, number of Karosa B731 buses is decreasing, due to supply of new low-floor buses, for example by SOR NB 12 made in Czech Republic. Last Karosa B731 in Prague was retired on 12 September 2014.

Historical vehicles 

 DP Ostrava (bus no. 6160) year 1986
 DP Praha (bus no. 3709) year 1985
 PMDP Plzeň (bus no. 348) year 1986
 DP Bratislava (1 bus B 731.04, formerly KHA SAD Bratislava and SAD Nové Zámky)
 DSZO Zlín (bus no. 655), year 1991
 DP Pardubice (bus no. 129)

Private collections:
 Civic association for saving historic buses and trolleybuses Jihlava (5 buss, one of Jihlava reg. No. 301 and one Pardubice reg. No. 18)
 ŠKODA-BUS club Plzeň (bus no. 385, year 1988)
 MHDT o.s. (Prague buses no. 7186 and 7227, both from the year 1995)
 Private collector (1 bus reg. No. 127, ex DP Opava)
 Private collector (1 bus reg. No. 270, ex DP České Budějovice)
 Private collector (bus B 731.04 ex DP Praha no. 2819)
 Private collector (Prague bus no. 7211)

See also 

  Article about Karosa B731 and B732 in Bratislava
 Article about Karosa B731 in Prague
 Photogallery of Karosa B731 in Brno
 Info about Karosa B 731 a B 732
 Page about major repairs of Karosa B 731.1659 in Prague

 List of buses

Buses manufactured by Karosa
Buses of the Czech Republic
Vehicles introduced in 1982